Thomas Josephus Heggelman (born 16 January 1987) is a Dutch cricketer. He played for the Netherlands in the 2014 ICC World Twenty20 tournament.

References

1987 births
Living people
Dutch cricketers
Netherlands One Day International cricketers
Sportspeople from Schiedam